AS Gosier is a football club of Guadeloupe, based in the town of Le Gosier.

They play in the Guadeloupe first division, the Guadeloupe Championnat National. In 2020, the team won their first league title. They won their second in 2021.

Achievements
 Guadeloupe Division of Honor (2): 2019–20, 2020–21

Current squad 2021-22

2022 Caribbean Club Shield

External links
 Tour des clubs 2008–2009 – Gwadafoot 
 Club info – Guadeloupe Football Federation 

Dragon, AS